Bella is a town and comune in the province of Potenza, in the southern Italian region of Basilicata. It is bounded by the comuni (municipalities) of Atella, Avigliano, Balvano, Baragiano, Muro Lucano, Ruoti, San Fele.

References

Cities and towns in Basilicata